Yvette Basting (born 8 June 1977) is a retired tennis player from the Netherlands. During her professional career from 1992–2002, she won seventeen titles on the ITF Women's Circuit and qualified twice for the Australian Open and Wimbledon.

Career highlights
On 5 March 2001, Basting reached her highest singles ranking: world number 92. Her best doubles ranking came on 28 May 2001, when she became world number 106. In her career, Yvette Basting reached the singles final 14 times in ITF Women's Circuit tournaments, winning eight titles. In 1994, she won the $25k Flensburg tournament in Germany and the $25k Poitiers tournament in France.

In 1999, Basting won the $25k Jaffa tournament in Israel, and in 2000, she won the $25k Pamplona tournament in Spain and the $50k Naples tournament in the United States.

In October 2000, with her partner Katalin Marosi, she won the $75k Poitiers.

In February 2001, partnering Elena Tatarkova, she won the $75k Dow Corning Tennis Classic in Midland, Michigan. In March 2001, Basting and Tatarkova won the $50k Minneapolis doubles title.

ITF finals

Singles (8–6)

Doubles (9–6)

References

External links
 
 

1977 births
Living people
Dutch female tennis players
People from Oosterhout
Sportspeople from North Brabant
20th-century Dutch women
21st-century Dutch women